The 2015 Kannywood Awards was the 2nd edition of the ceremony supported and sponsored by MTN Nigeria and took place in Abuja, the capital of Nigeria on January 31, 2015. The event was hosted by the Emir of Gumel, Ahmad Muhammad Sani.

Winners of the 2015 Kannywood Awards
List of Awards

Popular Choice Awards
 Best Actor – Ali Nuhu
 Best Actress – Nafisat Abdullahi
 Best Director – Yasin Auwal
 Best Comedian – Rabilu Musa Dalasan (Ibro)

Jurors Awards
 Best Film: Ashabul Kahfi
 Best Actor: Sadiq Sani Sadiq for Dinyar Makaho
 Best Actress – Hadiza Aliyu for Daga Ni Sai Ke
 Best Director – Aminu Saira for Ashabul Kahfi & Sabuwar Sangaya
 Best Supporting Actor – Mustapha Nabraska for Basaja Takun Karshe
 Best Supporting Actress – Fati Washa for ‘Ya Daga Allah
 Best Comedian – Rabilu Musa Danlasan (Ibro) for Andamali
 Best Cinematography – Ahmad Bello for Sarki Jatau
 Best Villain – A’isha Dankano for Uwar Mugu
 Best Costume – Zubairu I. Ataye for Sarki Jatau
 Best Make-Up – Suji J & I. Indabawa for Ashabul Kahfi
 Best Script – Rahma A. Majid for Suma Mata Ne
 Best Child Actor – Rahma Yasir for Gudan Jini
 Best Set Design – Faruk Sayyadi for Ashabul Kahfi
 Best Music – A. Alfazazi for Saki Kowa
 Best Visual Effect – Muhammad Ali for Saki Kowa
 Best Sound – Sani Candy for Sabuwar Sangaya
 Best Editor – Musa SB Dangi for Sarki Jatau

References

2015 in Nigerian cinema
Kannywood
Kannywood Awards